French Division 4 may refer to:

 Championnat National 2 (1993–present), current fourth tier of the French football pyramid
 French Division 4 (1978–1993), former fourth tier of the French football pyramid

See also 

 French Division 3 (disambiguation)